

John Kusiak (born July 20, 1948) is an American composer best known for his work with documentary filmmaker Errol Morris. He won the 2012 Cinema Eye Honors Award for Outstanding Achievement in Original Music Score for Morris' Tabloid. Kusiak has composed music for live performance, commercials, and museum installations as well as film and television. He began scoring films for Boston-based Northern Light Productions in the 1980s while he was a touring rock and roll guitarist, and founded the studio Kusiak Music in 1992. He lives in Arlington, Massachusetts.

Work Process 

Although his first instrument is guitar, he primarily composes film scores on piano. In an essay about scoring The Singing Revolution (a documentary about Estonian resistance during World War II), Kusiak writes that his "empathetic response to the events depicted" provided the foundation for his work process.

Selected credits 
 The American Experience (TV Series) (16 episodes, 2003–2019)
 Team Foxcatcher (2016)
 The Jinx: The Life and Deaths of Robert Durst (miniseries) (2 episodes, 2015)
 After the Wall: A World United (2011)
 Independent Lens (2 episodes) (2009–2011)
 Tabloid (2010)
 The Wall: A World Divided (2010)
 Yellowstone: Land to Life (2009)
 Secrecy (2008)
 Have You Seen Andy? (2007)
 Aquarium (2007)
 The Singing Revolution (2006)
 The Fog of War: Eleven Lessons from the Life of Robert S. McNamara (2003) Additional music (primary composer Philip Glass)
 First Person (12 episodes, 2000)
 WW III: World War III (1998)

Discography 

 Monhegan Suite and Other Musical Journeys (2013)
 Tabloid (2011)
 Errol Morris' First Person (Music from Season Two) (2005)
 Errol Morris' First Person (Music from Season One) (2005)
 Apokalypsis (2003)

References

External links 

 Official site
 
 John Kusiak at soundtrack.net

Living people
1948 births
American film score composers
American male film score composers